Torben Piechnik (born 21 May 1963) is a Danish former professional footballer who played as a centre back. He made a total of 15 appearances for the Denmark national team, which he represented in the 1992 European Championship and 1996 European Championship.

Biography
Born in Hellerup, Piechnik started his senior career with Kjøbenhavns Boldklub (KB) in the top-flight Danish 1st Division. He joined Ikast fS in 1988, and played two seasons for the club. In 1990, he joined B 1903, and in November 1991 he won his first Danish senior cap. He was part of the Denmark national team which won the UEFA Euro 1992. He started the tournament as a substitute, but when Henrik Andersen suffered an injury in the semi-finals, (ultimately, Andersen would miss the final due to suspension in any event), Piechnik replaced him in the final, for which he earned praise.

After the tournament, he followed the majority of the B 1903 players into the merging FC Copenhagen (FCK) club. Having played just seven league games for FCK, he was signed for English FA Cup holders Liverpool by manager Graeme Souness in September 1992, just weeks after the inception of the new Premier League. He joined a struggling Liverpool side, and had a hard time adapting to the English game. Piechnik made 16 first-team league appearances for Liverpool in the 1992–93 season, but only managed one in the whole of the 1993–94 season. When Graeme Souness was replaced by new manager Roy Evans in January 1994, Piechnik sensed that he was no longer part of the club's plans, and requested a transfer. His lack of success in Liverpool later earned him a selection in the Liverpool Echo's Merseyside Lost 11, a selection of players which the newspaper considered the biggest fiascos in the history of Liverpool and Everton.

He transferred to AGF in Denmark at the end of the season. He won the 1995–96 Danish Cup with AGF, and was called up to represent Denmark at the UEFA Euro 1996. He played the last of his 15 international matches at that tournament, before ending his national team career. He would play on for another three years at AGF, before retiring in 1999.

He has worked as both a real estate agent and masseur, while still playing "Old Boys" football in Denmark.

Honours
AGF
 Danish Cup: 1995–96

Denmark
 UEFA European Championship: 1992

References

External links
 
 
 

1963 births
Living people
Danish men's footballers
Association football defenders
Denmark international footballers
Danish expatriate men's footballers
Kjøbenhavns Boldklub players
F.C. Copenhagen players
Liverpool F.C. players
Ikast FS players
Aarhus Gymnastikforening players
Expatriate footballers in England
Premier League players
Danish Superliga players
UEFA Euro 1992 players
UEFA Euro 1996 players
UEFA European Championship-winning players
Danish people of Polish descent
People from Gentofte Municipality
Sportspeople from the Capital Region of Denmark